Jasse Ikonen (born June 13, 1990) is a Finnish professional ice hockey player. He is currently playing with Färjestad BK in the Swedish Hockey League (SHL).

Ikonen previously played in the Finnish Liiga with KalPa, JYP, HIFK, Oulun Kärpät, Ilves, Ässät and HC TPS.

Career statistics

References

External links

1990 births
Living people
People from Kuopio
Finnish ice hockey forwards
Ässät players
Färjestad BK players
HIFK (ice hockey) players
Ilves players
JYP Jyväskylä players
KalPa players
Linköping HC players
Oulun Kärpät players
HC Pustertal Wölfe players
SaPKo players
Sportspeople from North Savo
HC TPS players